The 1952 Harvard Crimson football team was an American football team that represented Harvard University during the 1952 college football season. In their third year under head coach Lloyd Jordan, the Crimson compiled a 5–4 record and outscored opponents 214 to 198. John D. Nichols Jr. was the team captain.

Harvard played its home games at Harvard Stadium in the Allston neighborhood of Boston, Massachusetts.

Schedule

References

Harvard
Harvard Crimson football seasons
Harvard Crimson football
1950s in Boston